Parris Bryan Duffus (born January 27, 1970) is an American former professional ice hockey goaltender.

Playing career
Duffus was drafted 180th overall by the St. Louis Blues in the 1990 NHL Entry Draft and played one NHL game for the Phoenix Coyotes in the 1996–97 NHL season. He allowed one goal on eight shots in his sole NHL appearance against the Vancouver Canucks on February 27, 1997, playing 28:49 of ice time.

He was the goaltender for the Minnesota Moose for two seasons and holds the Minnesota franchise record for a GAA of 3.31 (1995–96) and SV%: .895 (1995–96).

Duffus lead Team USA to a bronze medal in the IIHF World Championships in 1996 in Austria, the nation's first medal in 34 years. He also backstopped Team USA in qualifying play for Pool A after a disastrous 1998 World Championships. Duffus earned a shutout against Kazakhstan, beat Estonia & Austria to earn the US a berth in Pool A in the 1999 World Championships.

Duffus played in the Finnish SM-liiga where he played for HPK, Jokerit, and HIFK. He also played for the Berlin Capitals and Nürnberg Ice Tigers in Germany, and HC Neftekhimik Nizhnekamsk in Russia.

Duffus played for the Fort Wayne Komets of UHL in 2002–03 season before retiring.

After retiring from professional hockey, Duffus became a Fort Wayne firefighter but is called upon by the Komets periodically as an emergency backup goaltender.

Career statistics

Regular season and playoffs

International

Awards and honors

See also
List of players who played only one game in the NHL

References

External links

 Player Profile:Parris Duffus

1970 births
Living people
American men's ice hockey goaltenders
Anchorage Aces players
Berlin Capitals players
Cincinnati Cyclones (IHL) players
Cornell Big Red men's ice hockey players
American expatriate ice hockey players in Russia
Fort Wayne Komets players
Hampton Roads Admirals players
HC Neftekhimik Nizhnekamsk players
HIFK (ice hockey) players
HPK players
Ice hockey people from Denver
Jokerit players
Las Vegas Thunder players
Minnesota Moose players
Nürnberg Ice Tigers players
Peoria Rivermen (IHL) players
Phoenix Coyotes players
St. Louis Blues draft picks
AHCA Division I men's ice hockey All-Americans